Mehmed Necib Pasha (died 1851), also known as Muhammad Najib Pasha or Gürcü Mehmet Necip Paşa or Necib Pasha, was an Ottoman statesman and governor of Georgian origin. He was the governor of Baghdad Eyalet, succeeding Ali Ridha Pasha (who had brought Iraq back into direct Ottoman control).

His father's name was Abdülmucib. He was married to Zeliha Hanim (died1863) and his daughter was Fatima Hanim (died1881), his son's was Ahmed Şükrü Bey, Cemil Bey and Mahmud Nedim Pasha, was a two-time Grand Vizier of the Ottoman Empire.

Library
Mehmed Necib Pasha is known for having the Necip Paşa Library in Tire built in 1827 (today in İzmir Province, Turkey). At the time, he was serving as the "Minister of Powder Mills". It is not known why he had it built in Tire, as no known connection between him and the city existed before the library.

The library contains inscriptions made during construction, one of which reads:

References

External links

1851 deaths
Georgians from the Ottoman Empire
19th-century people from the Ottoman Empire
Pashas
Year of birth missing
Ottoman governors of Baghdad